Pope's Creek may refer to some locations in the United States:

Waterways
Popes Creek (Virginia)
Popes Creek (Maryland)

Communities
Popes Creek, Maryland